The Jewett Trophy is a Canadian sports trophy, in honour of Dr. B. L. Jewett, presented annually to the winner of the Atlantic University Sport Football Conference of U Sports.

Unlike the other three conference championship games, the game in which this trophy is awarded is not named for the trophy itself; it is known as the Loney Bowl.

The winner of the Jewett Trophy goes on to play in either the Uteck Bowl or the Mitchell Bowl, depending on annual rotations.

Note that prior to 1973, the championship was awarded to the first place team during the regular season.

Winners

Note: Each MVP listed above played for the winning team, except where otherwise noted.

* Game was decided in overtime; ** Game was decided in double overtime

Team Win/Loss records

References

U Sports football trophies and awards
Sport in Atlantic Canada